Elizabeth Ann "Beth" Malone (born January 2, 1969) is an American actress and singer known for her work in Broadway, off-Broadway and regional theatre. She originated the role of Alison Bechdel in the musical Fun Home, for which she was nominated for the Tony Award for Best Actress in a Musical.

Personal life and education
She was born in Auburn, Nebraska, and raised in Castle Rock, Colorado, the daughter of Peggy and Bill Malone. Her mother is a professional country music singer. Malone played the title role in Annie in middle school, and participated in theatre at Douglas County High School. Malone first attended Loretto Heights College for musical theatre. When the school closed in 1989 while she was there, she decided not to continue, because she was successful finding work without a degree. She later completed her degree through the University of Northern Colorado in 1996 and earned an MFA in Acting from UC Irvine in 2000.

She began her career working at the Country Dinner Playhouse at the age of 16. Malone moved to New York City at age 21. After a period of not finding work, she returned to Aspen, Colorado, where she was able to play a wide variety of roles. She received her Equity card performing in a production of Baby. She later moved to Sherman Oaks, California, where she began performing in television commercials and performing in many shows in the greater Los Angeles area. Malone is married to Rochelle Schoppert, a music technician.

Career
Malone made her Broadway debut in Ring of Fire in 2006. She appeared Off-Broadway in the musical Bingo: A Winning New Musical at St. Luke's Theatre in 2005. She appeared Off-Broadway in The Marvelous Wonderettes at the Westside Theatre as Betty Jean in 2008. She played the title role in Annie Get Your Gun in the Music Circus at the Wells Fargo Pavilion in Sacramento, California in August 2011, and again at the San Diego Musical Theatre in May 2014.

She played the title role in The Unsinkable Molly Brown at The Denver Center Theatre Company in September and October 2014. She played the role of "Molly Brown" in The Muny (St. Louis, Missouri) production of The Unsinkable Molly Brown in July 2017. The musical was directed and choreographed by Kathleen Marshall. Gossip columnist Michael Riedel speculated that The Unsinkable Molly Brown would be revived on Broadway, with Malone in the lead. She played the lead in an industry reading in November 2017 at the Roundabout Theatre Company. "A representative for Roundabout Theatre Company told Playbill there are currently no plans for a future production of the musical."

Malone has created a one-woman cabaret show titled Beth Malone: So Far. The show tells her life story, "from her offbeat childhood in small-town Colorado, to her not-quite-normal entrance into acting, to her left-of-center adult life." She has toured with the show in several locations, including Aspen, Colorado, at the Wheeler Opera House in 2011, and in New York City in 2012 at the Davenport Theatre.

Malone originated the role of (Big) Alison in the musical Fun Home, from workshops, to the 2013 Off-Broadway production at the Public Theater. She continued the role in the 2015 Broadway production at the Circle in the Square Theatre, which concluded its Broadway engagement on September 10, 2016. Critic Steven Suskin called her performance "the glue that holds the show together." She received a nomination for the Tony Award for Best Actress in a Musical for her performance. Although Beth has found success on stage and on the screen, her role in Fun Home was one of the first times she was able to portray a character who identified as homosexual.

Malone played the Angel at certain performances in the Broadway revival of Tony Kushner's play Angels in America at the Neil Simon Theatre. Transferring from London's National Theatre, the production was directed by Marianne Elliott and stars Andrew Garfield as Prior Walter and Nathan Lane as Roy Cohn. The limited engagement began previews on February 23, opened on March 25, and closed on July 15, 2018.

Activism
Malone believes supporting the LGBTQ community is very important, and she continually shows her support by performing at over 50 benefits a year for LGBTQ groups and nonprofits. In addition to showing her pride for the queer community, she is also involved in organizations foundations that advocate for all women and their equality, like the Aqua Foundation. Malone uses the success of Fun Home to propel her advocacy because the show "helped [her] define [her] own beliefs and commit to them publicly." Malone states how she has recently become aware of how “living [her] life openly can be a beacon for other people." When she was performing in Fun Home, she took the time to converse with young girls and boys who struggled with embracing this identity. Malone's advocacy greatly evolved as a result of this Broadway production. Not only was Fun Home an award-winning musical, it was reportedly also a "social outreach program".

Beth Malone: So Far...
In 2011, Beth Malone started to perform her one-woman show, titled Beth Malone: So Far. Malone describes this production as an "autobiographical tale about what it was like for [her] to be a rural lesbian in the '70s." This one-hour production takes the audience on a journey through her teenage years and young adulthood. Malone pegs herself as "part dude, part lady… all lesbian." This musical cabaret depicts Malone's life, yet she is careful to make sure that her performance avoids the coming-out cliche. Instead, So Far is a coming-of-age story, which highlights her relationship with her father and how their relationship changed when she came out. Although there are several emotional and "heart-wrenching" moments in the show, Malone's presentation is inherently comedic, and she incorporates humor throughout her concert. Malone has continued to develop and craft So Far over the years, and she still performs her cabaret throughout the country.

Theatre credits

Filmography

Musical albums
 Lunch Shift

Malone released her first solo album in 2008, and it is available on iTunes and Spotify.

Awards and nominations

References

External links
 
 
 

1969 births
Living people
Actresses from Nebraska
American musical theatre actresses
21st-century American actresses
21st-century American singers
Actresses from Colorado
People from Auburn, Nebraska
People from Castle Rock, Colorado
University of Northern Colorado alumni
University of California, Irvine alumni
American lesbian actresses
20th-century American actresses
20th-century American singers
20th-century American women singers
21st-century American women singers
Singers from Nebraska
Singers from Colorado
LGBT people from Nebraska
LGBT people from Colorado
21st-century LGBT people